PWA Silverdome is an arena in Zoetermeer, Netherlands. It is primarily used for ice hockey. PWA Silverdome opened in 2002 and holds 3,500 people.

External links 
Official site

Indoor arenas in the Netherlands
Indoor ice hockey venues in the Netherlands
Sports venues in South Holland
Sport in Zoetermeer